Jerzy Janiszewski (born 11 March 1952 in Płock) is a Polish artist, best known for designing the Solidarity logo in 1980.

He received a diploma of Gdansk Academy of Fine Arts in 1976. His creations include logotypes, posters, scenographies and open-air installations.

External links 
 Article title
 http://www.jerzy-janiszewski.com
 https://commons.wikimedia.org/wiki/Category:Jerzy_Janiszewski_(artist)

Polish artists
Polish poster artists
1953 births
Living people
Academy of Fine Arts in Gdańsk alumni